Benjamin Boas (born 1983) is an American author, translator, and contemporary Japanese culture consultant. He has been appointed as a Cool Japan Ambassador by the Japanese government and as a Tourism Ambassador for Nakano, Tokyo.

Biography 
Born in New York, he grew up with a fondness for Japanese games and comic books, which motivated him to study the Japanese language and culture. After graduating from Brown University, he studied at Kyoto University on a Fulbright scholarship from 2007. He has also held research positions at the University of Tokyo as a Monbukagakusho scholar, at the Osaka University of Commerce, and at the anthropology department at Keio University Shonan Fujisawa Campus.

In 2015, he published his experiences of learning Japanese culture and language into a manga from Shogakukan. The same year, he was appointed as a Tourism Ambassador by the Nakano Tourism Association, to spread word about Nakano City.

In 2016, after Studio Ghibli commissioned him to write a critical essay on the Japanese government's self-promotion activities, he was appointed as a Cool Japan Ambassador by the Japanese Cabinet Office as part of their Cool Japan initiative.
In this role, he regularly appears in programs on Japan's public broadcaster NHK, such as Tokyo Eye 2020 and Journeys in Japan. While spreading the appeal of contemporary Japan through these activities, he also writes critically about how the country could improve its efforts, and has been quoted in news articles for his views of the Cool Japan strategy. He is a frequent speaker at universities and institutions in Japan and the United States.

Boas holds a 2nd-degree black belt and instructor certification for aikido from Yoshinkan. He also represents the United States in international competitions of mahjong and took third place in the 2007 Open European Mahjong Championship and second place in the 2008 European Riichi Championship.

Bibliography

Books

Articles

Documentaries 
 Journeys in Japan (NHK WORLD)
 "Yanai: Old Town of Goldfish Lanterns"
 TOKYO EYE 2020 (NHK WORLD)
 Jul. 2017 "Countdown to 2020: Enhancing Tourism with Technology"
 Sep. 2017 "Nakano: A Subculture Paradise"
 Jun. 2018 "A Martial Arts Tour of Tokyo"
 Jan. 2019 "Exploring Tokyo Underground"

Translations 
 Battleship Island Building No. 30, Between Dreams and Reality by Takahashi Masatsugu. Daiwa Shobo
 Dance Time (2016), directed by Mariko Nonaka

References

External links 
 

1983 births
Living people
Brown University alumni
20th-century American male writers
20th-century American writers
American expatriates in Japan